Alessandro Vaglio     (born January 28, 1989)  is an Italian professional baseball infielder, for the Fortitudo Baseball Bologna in the Italian Baseball League.

He also played for the Italy national baseball team in the 2010 Intercontinental Cup, the 2013 World Baseball Classic, and the 2019 European Baseball Championship. He is playing for the team at the Africa/Europe 2020 Olympic Qualification tournament, taking place in Italy beginning September 18, 2019.

References

External links

1989 births
2013 World Baseball Classic players
2015 WBSC Premier12 players
2016 European Baseball Championship players
2017 World Baseball Classic players
2019 European Baseball Championship players
Baseball infielders
Fortitudo Baseball Bologna players
Grosseto Baseball Club players
Italian baseball players
Living people
Minor league baseball players
Unipol Bologna players